Tagleft is a small town and rural commune in Azilal Province of the Béni Mellal-Khénifra region of Morocco. At the time of the 2004 census, the commune had a total population of 12184 people living in 2213 households.

References

Populated places in Azilal Province
Rural communes of Béni Mellal-Khénifra